Adam Alexander Armstrong, OBE, MC (1 July 1909 – 22 February 1982), commonly known as Bill Armstrong, was an Australian politician. Born in Deniliquin, New South Wales, he was a grazier before serving in the military 1939–45 (during World War II). Subsequently, he became involved in local politics, serving on Conargo Shire Council. In 1965 he was elected to the Australian House of Representatives in the by-election for the seat of Riverina that followed the resignation of Hugh Roberton; Armstrong was a member of the Country Party. He held the seat until 1969, when he was defeated by Labor's Al Grassby. Armstrong died in 1982.

References

National Party of Australia members of the Parliament of Australia
Members of the Australian House of Representatives for Riverina
Members of the Australian House of Representatives
1909 births
1982 deaths
People from Deniliquin
Australian Officers of the Order of the British Empire
20th-century Australian politicians
Australian Army personnel of World War II
Australian Army officers